James Clark Molesworth Gardner  (15 March 1894 – 7 March 1970) was a British entomologist who worked on the systematics of insects, particularly forest insects, while employed in the Indian Forest Service at the Forest Research Institute, Dehra Dun in India.

Gardner was a fellow of the Royal Entomological Society of London from 1920. Gardner studied entomology under Harold Maxwell Lefroy. He worked as a systematic entomologist at the Forest Research Institute in Dehra Dun, recruited along with Malcolm Cameron by C.F.C. Beeson. He worked briefly in Bengal before moving to Dehra Dun in 1923 after Cameron moved back to England. He specialized on wood damaging beetle larvae (especially from families such as Anthribidae, Platypodidae, Bostrichidae, Scolytidae, Eucnemidae, Cleridae and Cerambycidae) but also worked on taxonomic aspects of beetles based on larval characters. He published a series of articles on the "Immature stages of Indian Coleoptera" and also worked on Lepidoptera, particularly moths of the family Noctuidae (now known as the Erebidae). He headed the systematic entomology division at the FRI from 1941 to 1947 and was created companion of Order of the Indian Empire in 1945.

Publications 
Some of the writings of Gardner include:

References 

British entomologists
1894 births
1970 deaths
Fellows of the Royal Entomological Society
English coleopterists
Naturalists of British India
British people in colonial India